The Samsung Galaxy Buds Live are a release of Bluetooth wireless earbuds by Samsung Electronics for their Samsung Gear range. They were officially announced on August 5, 2020 during a virtual Galaxy Unpacked event.

Features 
The Galaxy Buds Live feature active noise cancellation, a bean shape and a wingtip design. Black, white, and Mystic Bronze are the available color variations for the earbuds. The earbuds measure 2.8 cm longitudinally and 1.3 cm wide whilst the charging case is 2.6 cm thick. The lower part of the buds fit directly inside the ear canal whilst the back fills the upper part of the ear.

References 

Samsung wearable devices
Bluetooth speakers